The oceanic, wind driven Ekman spiral is the result of a force balance created by a shear stress force, Coriolis force and the water drag. This force balance gives a resulting current of the water different from the winds. In the ocean, there are two places where the Ekman spiral can be observed. At the surface of the ocean, the shear stress force corresponds with the wind stress force. At the bottom of the ocean, the shear stress force is created by friction with the ocean floor. This phenomenon was first observed at the surface by the Norwegian oceanographer Fridtjof Nansen during his Fram expedition. He noticed that icebergs did not drift in the same direction as the wind. His student, the Swedish oceanographer Vagn Walfrid Ekman, was the first person to physically explain this process.

Bottom Ekman Spiral 

In order to derive the properties of an Ekman spiral a look is taken at a uniform, horizontal geostrophic interior flow in a homogeneous fluid. Another result of this property is that the horizontal gradients will equal zero. As a result, the continuity equation will yield, . Note that the concerning interior flow is horizontal, so  at all depths, even in the boundary layers. In this case, the Navier-Stokes momentum equations, governing geophysical motion can now be reduced to:

Where  is the Coriolis parameter,  the fluid density and  the eddy viscosity, which are all taken as a constant here for simplicity. These parameters have a small variance on the scale of an Ekman spiral, thus this approximation will hold. A uniform flow requires a uniformly varying pressure gradient.

Using the last of the three equations at the top of this section, yields that the pressure is independent of depth.

 and   will suffice as a solution to the differential equations above. After substitution of these possible solutions in the same equations,   will follow. Now,   has the following possible outcomes:

In the end, this will lead to the following solution for :

Here, . This is the reason why  is defined as the thickness of the Ekman layer. A number of important properties of the Ekman spiral will follow from this solution: 
When , it appears that the flow has a transverse component with respect to the interior flow, which differs 45 degrees to the left on the northern hemisphere, and 45 degrees to the right on the southern hemisphere, . Note that, in this case, the angle between this flow and the interior flow is at its maximum. It will decrease for increasing . 
Because of these properties, the velocity vector of the flow as a function of depth will look like a spiral.

Surface Ekman Spiral 

The solution for the flow forming the bottom Ekman spiral was a result of the shear stress exerted on the flow by the bottom. Logically, wherever shear stress can be exerted on a flow, Ekman spirals will form. This is the case at the air-water interface, because of wind. A situation is considered where a wind stress  is exerted along a water-surface with an interior flow  beneath. Again, the flow is uniform, has a geostrophic interior and is homogeneous fluid. The equations of motion for a geostrophic flow, which are the same as stated in the bottom spiral section, can be reduced to:

The boundary conditions for this case are as follows:

 Surface :    and 
 Towards interior :  and  

With these conditions, the solution can be determined:

Some differences with respect to the bottom Ekman spiral emerge. The deviation from the interior flow is exclusively dependent on the wind stress and not on the interior flow. Whereas in the case of the bottom Ekman spiral, the deviation is determined by the interior flow. The wind-driven component of the flow is inversely proportional with respect to the Ekman-layer thickness . So if the layer thickness is small, because of a small viscosity of the fluid for example, this component could be very large. At last, the flow at the surface is 45 degrees to the right on the northern hemisphere and 45 degrees to the left on the southern hemisphere with respect to the wind-direction. In case of the bottom Ekman spiral, this is the other way around.

Observations 
The equations and assumptions above are not representative for the actual observations of the Ekman spiral. The differences between the theory and the observations are that the angle is between 5-20 degrees instead of the 45 degrees as expected and that the Ekman layer depth and thus the Ekman spiral is less deep than expected. There are three main factors which contribute to the reason why this is, stratification, turbulence and horizontal gradients. Other less important factors which play a role in this are the Stokes drift, waves and the Stokes-Coriolis force.

References 

Oceanography
Fluid dynamics